Wireless Internet Protocols are the suite of wireless protocols after Wireless Application Protocol 2.0 (WAP). It includes XHTML Basic, Nokia's XHTML Mobile Profile, and future developments of WAP by the Open Mobile Alliance.

Wireless Internet Protocols are able to deliver XHTML pages to appropriate wireless devices without the need for HTTP to WAP proxies.

Using Wireless Internet Protocols, web pages can be rendered differently in web browsers and on handhelds without the need for two different versions of the same page.

References

Internet protocols